XHBCD-FM is a radio station in Pachuca and is part of the Radio y Televisión de Hidalgo state network. It broadcasts on 98.1 MHz from the RTH studios in the center of Pachuca.

The station signed on in the early 1980s as part of the construction of the state radio and TV networks.

References

Radio stations in Hidalgo (state)
Public radio in Mexico